Virginia's 10th Senate district is one of 40 districts in the Senate of Virginia. The district has been represented by Democrat Ghazala Hashmi since 2020, following her 2019 defeat of incumbent Republican Glen Sturtevant.

Geography
District 10 is located in the Greater Richmond Region, covering much of the City of Richmond as well as all of Powhatan County and parts of Chesterfield County.

The district overlaps with Virginia's 4th and 7th congressional districts, and with the 27th, 65th, 66th, 68th, 69th, and 71st districts of the Virginia House of Delegates.

Recent election results

2019

2015

2011

Federal and statewide results in District 10

Historical results
All election results below took place prior to 2011 redistricting, and thus were under different district lines.

2007

2003

1999

1998 special

1995

References

Virginia Senate districts
Government in Chesterfield County, Virginia
Powhatan County, Virginia